2018 was the 7th year in the history of RXF, the largest mixed martial arts promotion based in Romania.

List of events

RXF 30
 

RXF 30: Bucharest was a mixed martial arts event that took place on August 20, 2018 at the Sala Polivalentă in Bucharest, Romania.

Results

RXF 31
 

RXF 31: Cluj-Napoca was a mixed martial arts event that took place on October 1, 2018 at the Horia Demian Arena in Cluj-Napoca, Romania.

Results

RXF 32
 

RXF 32: Negumereanu vs. Konecke was a mixed martial arts event that took place on November 19, 2018 at the Dumitru Popescu Arena in Brașov, Romania.

Results

RXF 33
 

RXF 33: All Stars was a mixed martial arts event that took place on December 10, 2018 at the Sala Polivalentă in Bucharest, Romania.

Results

See also 
 2018 in Romanian kickboxing

References

External links
RXF
 

2018 in mixed martial arts
Real Xtreme Fighting events